Przybówka  is a village in the administrative district of Gmina Wojaszówka, within Krosno County, Subcarpathian Voivodeship, in south-eastern Poland. The village has a population of 830.

References

Villages in Krosno County